A whistleblower (also written as whistle-blower or whistle blower) is a person, often an employee, who reveals information about activity within a private or public organization that is deemed illegal, immoral, illicit, unsafe or fraudulent. Whistleblowers can use a variety of internal or external channels to communicate  information or allegations. Over 83% of whistleblowers report internally to a supervisor, human resources, compliance, or a neutral third party within the company, hoping that the company will address and correct the issues.  A whistleblower can also bring allegations to light by communicating with external entities, such as the media, government, or law enforcement. Whistleblowing can occur in either the private sector or the public sector.

Retaliation is a real risk for whistleblowers, who often pay a heavy price for blowing the whistle. The most common form of retaliation is  abrupt termination of employment. However, several other actions may also be considered retaliatory, including extreme increases in workloads, having hours cut drastically, preventing task completion, or bullying. Laws in many countries attempt to protect whistleblowers and to regulate the whistleblowing activities. These laws tend to adopt different approaches to public and private sector whistleblowing.

Whistleblowers do not always achieve their aims. For their claims to be credible and successful, they must have compelling evidence to support their claims that the government or regulating body can use or investigate to "prove" such claims and hold corrupt companies and/or government agencies to account.

Overview

Origin of term
U.S. civic activist Ralph Nader is said to have coined the phrase in the early 1970s  in order to avoid the negative connotations found in other words such as "informer" and "snitch". However, the origins of the word date back to the 19th century.

The word is linked to the use of a whistle to alert the public or a crowd about such problems as the commission of a crime or the breaking of rules during a game. The phrase whistle blower attached itself to law enforcement officials in the 19th century because they used a whistle to alert the public or fellow police. Sports referees, who use a whistle to indicate an illegal or foul play, also were called whistle blowers.

An 1883 story in the Janesville Gazette called a policeman who used his whistle to alert citizens about a riot a whistle blower, without the hyphen. By the year 1963, the phrase had become a hyphenated word, whistle-blower. The word began to be used by journalists in the 1960s for people who revealed wrongdoing, such as Nader. It eventually evolved into the compound word whistleblower.

Channels for whistleblowing

Internal channels 
Most whistleblowers are internal whistleblowers, who report misconduct on a fellow employee or superior within their company through anonymous reporting mechanisms often called hotlines. One of the most interesting questions with respect to internal whistleblowers is why and under what circumstances do people either act on the spot to stop illegal and otherwise unacceptable behavior or report it. There are some reasons to believe that people are more likely to take action with respect to unacceptable behavior, within an organization, if there are complaint systems that offer not just options dictated by the planning and control organization, but a choice of options for absolute confidentiality.

Anonymous reporting mechanisms, as mentioned previously, help foster a climate whereby employees are more likely to report or seek guidance regarding potential or actual wrongdoing without fear of retaliation. The coming anti-bribery management systems standard, ISO 37001, includes anonymous reporting as one of the criteria for the new standard.

External channels 
External whistleblowers, however, report misconduct to outside people or entities. In these cases, depending on the nature of the information, whistleblowers may report the misconduct to lawyers, the media, law enforcement or watchdog agencies, or other local, state, or federal agencies. In some cases, external whistleblowing is encouraged by offering monetary rewards.

Third party channels 
Sometimes organizations use external agencies to create a secure and anonymous reporting channel for its employees, often referred to as a whistleblowing hotline. As well as protecting the identity of the whistleblower, these services are designed to inform the individuals at the top of the organizational pyramid of misconduct, usually via integration with specialised case management software.

Implementing a third party solution is often the easiest way for an organization to promote compliance, or to offer a whistleblowing policy where one did not previously exist. An increasing number of companies and authorities use third party services in which the whistleblower is anonymous also towards the third party service provider, which is made possible via toll free phone numbers and/or web or app-based solutions which apply asymmetrical encryption.

Private versus public sectors

Private sector whistleblowing 
Private sector whistleblowing is arguably more prevalent and suppressed in society today. An example of private sector whistleblowing is when an employee reports to someone in a higher position such as a manager, or to external factors, such as their lawyer or the police. Whistleblowing in the private sector is typically not high-profile or openly discussed in major news outlets, though occasionally, third parties expose human rights violations and exploitation of workers.

Many governments attempt to protect such whistleblowers. In the United States, for example, there are organizations such as the United States Department of Labor (DOL), and laws such as the Sarbanes-Oxley Act and the United States Federal Sentencing Guidelines for Organizations (FSGO) that protect whistleblowers in the private sector. Thus, despite government efforts to help regulate the private sector, the employees must still weigh their options. They either expose the company and stand the moral and ethical high ground; or expose the company, lose their job, their reputation and potentially the ability to be employed again. According to a study at the University of Pennsylvania, out of three hundred whistleblowers studied, sixty nine percent of them had foregone that exact situation; and they were either fired or were forced to retire after taking the ethical high ground. It is outcomes like that which makes it all that much harder to accurately track how prevalent whistleblowing is in the private sector.

Public sector whistleblowing 

Recognition of the value of public sector whistleblowing has been growing over the last 50 years. In the United States, for example, both state and Federal statutes have been put in place to protect whistleblowers from retaliation. The United States Supreme Court ruled that public sector whistleblowers are protected from retaliation by their First Amendment rights. After many federal whistleblowers were covered in high-profile media cases, laws were finally introduced to protect government whistleblowers. These laws were enacted to help prevent corruption and encourage people to expose misconduct, illegal, or dishonest activity for the good of society. People who choose to act as whistleblowers often suffer retaliation from their employer. They most likely are fired because they are an at-will employee, which means they can be fired without a reason. There are exceptions in place for whistleblowers who are at-will employees. Even without a statute, numerous decisions encourage and protect whistleblowing on grounds of public policy. Statutes state that an employer shall not take any adverse employment actions any employee in retaliation for a good-faith report of a whistleblowing action or cooperating in any way in an investigation, proceeding, or lawsuit arising under said action. Federal whistleblower legislation includes a statute protecting all government employees. In the federal civil service, the government is prohibited from taking, or threatening to take, any personnel action against an employee because the employee disclosed information that they reasonably believed showed a violation of law, gross mismanagement, and gross waste of funds, abuse of authority, or a substantial and specific danger to public safety or health. To prevail on a claim, a federal employee must show that a protected disclosure was made, that the accused official knew of the disclosure, that retaliation resulted, and that there was a genuine connection between the retaliation and the employee's action.

Risks
Individual harm, damage to public trust, and threats to national security are three categories of harm that may come as a result of whistleblowing. Revealing a whistleblower's identity can automatically put their life in danger. Some media outlets associate words like "traitor" and "treason" with whistleblowers, and in many countries around the world, the punishment for treason is the death penalty, even if whoever allegedly committed treason may not have caused anyone physical harm. In some instances, whistleblowers must flee their country to avoid public scrutiny, threats of death or physical harm, and in some cases criminal charges.

Whistleblowers are often protected under law from employer retaliation, but in many cases punishment has occurred, such as termination, suspension, demotion, wage garnishment, and/or harsh mistreatment by other employees. A 2009 study found that up to 38% of whistleblowers experienced professional retaliation in some form, including wrongful termination. Following dismissal, whistleblowers may struggle to find employment due to damaged reputations, poor references and blacklisting. The socioeconomic impact of whistleblowing through loss of livelihood and family strain may also impact on whistleblowers' psychological well being. Whistleblowers often experience immense stress as a result of litigation regarding harms such as unfair dismissal, which they often face with little or no support from unions. Whistleblowers who continue to pursue their concerns may also face long battles with official bodies such as regulators and government departments. Such bodies may reproduce the "institutional silence" adopted by employers, adding to whistleblowers' stress and difficulties. Thus, whistleblowers often suffer great injustice that is never acknowledged or rectified.

In a few cases, however, harm is done by the whistleblower to innocent people. Whistleblowers can make unintentional mistakes, and investigations can be tainted by the fear of negative publicity. An example occurred in the Canadian health ministry, when a new employee wrongly concluded that nearly every research contract she saw in 2012 involved malfeasance. The end result was the sudden firing of seven people, false and public threats of a criminal investigation, and the death of one researcher by suicide. The government ultimately paid the victims millions of dollars for lost pay, slander, and other harms, in addition to CA $2.41 million spent on the subsequent 2015 investigation into the false charges.

Attitudes toward whistleblowers

Whistleblowers are seen by some as selfless martyrs for public interest and organizational accountability; others view them as "traitors" or "defectors". Some even accuse them of solely pursuing personal glory and fame, or view their behavior as motivated by greed in qui tam cases.  Culturally it still has connotations of betrayal, from ‘snitching’ at one level to ‘denunciations’ at the other. Speaking out is difficult, especially in a culture where this is not promoted or even actively discouraged. Some academics (such as Thomas Faunce) feel that whistleblowers should at least be entitled to a rebuttable presumption that they are attempting to apply ethical principles in the face of obstacles and that whistleblowing would be more respected in governance systems if it had a firmer academic basis in virtue ethics.

It is likely that many people do not even consider blowing the whistle, not only because of fear of retaliation, but also because of fear of losing their relationships at work and outside work.

Persecution of whistleblowers has become a serious issue in many parts of the world:

Employees in academia, business or government might become aware of serious risks to health and the environment, but internal policies might pose threats of retaliation to those who report these early warnings. Private company employees in particular might be at risk of being fired, demoted, denied raises and so on for bringing environmental risks to the attention of appropriate authorities. Government employees could be at a similar risk for bringing threats to health or the environment to public attention, although perhaps this is less likely.

There are examples of "early warning scientists" being harassed for bringing inconvenient truths about impending harm to the notice of the public and authorities. There have also been cases of young scientists being discouraged from entering controversial scientific fields for fear of harassment.

In order to help whistleblowers, private organizations have formed whistleblower legal defense funds or support groups. Examples include the National Whistleblowers Center in the United States, and Whistleblowers UK and Public Concern at Work (PCaW) in the United Kingdom. Depending on the circumstances, it is not uncommon for whistleblowers to be ostracized by their co-workers, discriminated against by future potential employers, or even fired from their organization. This campaign directed at whistleblowers with the goal of eliminating them from the organization is referred to as mobbing. It is an extreme form of workplace bullying wherein the group is set against the targeted individual.

Psychological impact
There is limited research on the psychological impacts of whistle blowing. However, poor experiences with whistleblowing can cause a prolonged and prominent assault upon the well being of the whistleblower. As workers attempt to address concerns, they are often met with a wall of silence and hostility by management or colleagues. Depression is often reported by whistleblowers, and suicidal thoughts may occur in up to about 10%. General deterioration in health and self care has been described. The range of symptomatology shares many of the features of posttraumatic stress disorder, though there is debate about whether the trauma experienced by whistleblowers meets diagnostic thresholds. Increased stress related physical illness has also been described in whistleblowers.

The stresses involved in whistleblowing can be huge and may deter whistleblowing out of fear of failure and reprisals. Some whistleblowers speak of overwhelming and persistent distress, drug and alcohol problems, paranoid behaviour at work, acute anxiety, nightmares, flashbacks and intrusive thoughts. This fear may indeed be justified, because an individual who feels threatened by whistleblowing, may plan the career destruction of the 'complainant' by reporting fictitious errors or rumours. This technique, labelled as "gaslighting", is a common approach used by organizations to manage employees who cause difficulty by raising concerns. In extreme cases, this technique involves the organization or manager proposing that the complainant's mental health is unstable. Organizations also often attempt to ostracise and isolate whistleblowers by undermining their concerns by suggesting that these are groundless, carrying out inadequate investigations or by ignoring them altogether. Whistleblowers may also be disciplined, suspended and reported to professional bodies upon manufactured pretexts.

Such extreme experiences of threat and loss inevitably cause severe distress and sometimes mental illness, sometimes lasting for years afterwards. This mistreatment also deters others from coming forward with concerns. Thus, poor practices remain hidden behind a wall of silence, and prevent any organization from experiencing the improvements that may be afforded by intelligent failure. Some whistleblowers who break ranks with their organizations have had their mental stability questioned, such as Adrian Schoolcraft, the NYPD veteran who alleged falsified crime statistics in his department and was forcibly committed to a mental institution. Conversely, the emotional strain of a whistleblower investigation is devastating to the accused's family.

Ethics
'Ethics' is the set of moral principles that govern a person's or group's behavior. Deeper questions and theories of whistleblowing and why people choose to do so can be studied through an ethical approach. Whistleblowing is a topic of several myths and inaccurate definitions. Leading arguments in the ideological camp, maintain that whistleblowing is the most basic of ethical traits and simply telling the truth to stop illegal harmful activities, or fraud against the government/taxpayers. In the opposite camp, many corporations and corporate or government leaders see whistleblowing as being disloyal for breaching confidentiality, especially in industries that handle sensitive client or patient information.  Hundreds of laws grant protection to whistleblowers, but stipulations can easily cloud that protection and leave whistleblowers vulnerable to retaliation, sometimes even threats and physical harm. However, the decision and action has become far more complicated with recent advancements in technology and communication.

The ethical implications of whistleblowing can be negative as well as positive. Some have argued that public sector whistleblowing plays an important role in the democratic process by resolving principle agent problems. However, sometimes employees may blow the whistle as an act of revenge. Rosemary O'Leary explains this in her short volume on a topic called guerrilla government. "Rather than acting openly, guerrillas often choose to remain "in the closet", moving clandestinely behind the scenes, salmon swimming upstream against the current of power. Over the years, I have learned that the motivations driving guerrillas are diverse. The reasons for acting range from the altruistic (doing the right thing) to the seemingly petty (I was passed over for that promotion). Taken as a whole, their acts are as awe inspiring as saving human lives out of a love of humanity and as trifling as slowing the issuance of a report out of spite or anger." For example, of the more than 1,000 whistleblower complaints that are filed each year with the Pentagon's Inspector General, about 97 percent are not substantiated. It is believed throughout the professional world that an individual is bound to secrecy within their work sector. Discussions of whistleblowing and employee loyalty usually assume that the concept of loyalty is irrelevant to the issue or, more commonly, that whistleblowing involves a moral choice that pits the loyalty that an employee owes an employer against the employee's responsibility to serve the public interest. Robert A. Larmer describes the standard view of whistleblowing in the Journal of Business Ethics by explaining that an employee possesses prima facie (based on the first impression; accepted as correct until proved otherwise) duties of loyalty and confidentiality to their employers and that whistleblowing cannot be justified except on the basis of a higher duty to the public good. It is important to recognize that in any relationship which demands loyalty the relationship works both ways and involves mutual enrichment.

The ethics of Edward Snowden's actions have been widely discussed and debated in news media and academia worldwide. Edward Snowden released classified intelligence to the American people in an attempt to allow Americans to see the inner workings of the government. A person is diligently tasked with the conundrum of choosing to be loyal to the company or to blow the whistle on the company's wrongdoing. Discussions on whistleblowing generally revolve around three topics: attempts to define whistleblowing more precisely, debates about whether and when whistleblowing is permissible, and debates about whether and when one has an obligation to blow the whistle.

Motivations
Many whistleblowers have stated that they were motivated to take action to put an end to unethical practices, after witnessing injustices in their businesses or organizations. A 2009 study found that whistleblowers are often motivated to take action when they notice a sharp decline in ethical practices, as opposed to a gradual worsening. There are generally two metrics by which whistleblowers determine if a practice is unethical. The first metric involves a violation of the organization's bylaws or written ethical policies. These violations allow individuals to concretize and rationalize blowing the whistle. On the other hand, "value-driven" whistleblowers are influenced by their personal codes of ethics. In these cases, whistleblowers have been criticized for being driven by personal biases.

In addition to ethics, social and organizational pressure are a motivating forces. A 2012 study shows that individuals are more likely to blow the whistle when others know about the wrongdoing, because they fear the consequences of keeping silent. In cases where one person is responsible for wrongdoing, the whistleblower may file a formal report, rather than directly confronting the wrongdoer, because confrontation would be more emotionally and psychologically stressful. Furthermore, individuals may be motivated to report unethical behavior when they believe their organizations will support them. Professionals in management roles may feel responsibility to blow the whistle to uphold the values and rules of their organizations.

Legal protection for whistleblowers

Legal protection for whistleblowers varies from country to country and may depend on the country of the original activity, where and how secrets were revealed, and how they eventually became published or publicized. Over a dozen countries have now adopted comprehensive whistleblower protection laws that create mechanisms for reporting wrongdoing and provide legal protections to whistleblowers. Over 50 countries have adopted more limited protections as part of their anti-corruption, freedom of information, or employment laws. For purposes of the English Wikipedia, this section emphasizes the English-speaking world and covers other regimes only insofar as they represent exceptionally greater or lesser protections.

Australia

There are laws in a number of states. The former NSW Police Commissioner Tony Lauer summed up official government and police attitudes as: "Nobody in Australia much likes whistleblowers, particularly in an organization like the police or the government." The former Australian intelligence officer known as Witness K, who provided evidence of Australia's controversial spying operation against the government of East Timor in 2004, face the possibility of jail if convicted.

Whistleblowers Australia is an association for those who have exposed corruption or any form of malpractice, especially if they were then hindered or abused.

Canada
The Public Sector Integrity Commissioner (PSIC) provides a safe and confidential mechanism enabling public servants and the general public to disclose wrongdoings committed in the public sector. It also protects from reprisal public servants who have disclosed wrongdoing and those who have cooperated in investigations. The office's goal is to enhance public confidence in Canada's federal public institutions and in the integrity of public servants.

Mandated by the Public Servants Disclosure Protection Act, PSIC is a permanent and independent agent of Parliament. The act, which came into force in 2007, applies to most of the federal public sector, approximately 400,000 public servants. This includes government departments and agencies, parent Crown corporations, the Royal Canadian Mounted Police and other federal public sector bodies.

Not all disclosures lead to an investigation as the act sets out the jurisdiction of the commissioner and gives the option not to investigate under certain circumstances. On the other hand, if PSIC conducts an investigation and finds no wrongdoing was committed, the commissioner must report his findings to the discloser and to the organization's chief executive. Also, reports of founded wrongdoing are presented before the House of Commons and the Senate in accordance with the act.

The act also established the Public Servants Disclosure Protection Tribunal (PSDPT) to protect public servants by hearing reprisal complaints referred by the Public Sector Integrity Commissioner. The tribunal can grant remedies in favour of complainants and order disciplinary action against persons who take reprisals.

European Union
The European Parliament approved a "Whistleblower Protection Directive" containing broad free speech protections for whistleblowers in both the public and the private sectors, including for journalists, in all member states of the European Union. The Directive prohibits direct or indirect retaliation against employees, current and former, in the public sector and the private sector. The Directive's protections apply to employees, to volunteers, and to those who assist them, including to civil society organizations and to journalists who report on their evidence. It provides equal rights for whistleblowers in the national security sector who challenge denial or removal of their security clearances. Also, whistleblowers are protected from criminal prosecution and corporate lawsuits for damages resulting from their whistleblowing, and provides for psychological support for dealing with harassment stress.

Good government observers have hailed the EU directive as setting "the global standard for best practice rights protecting freedom of speech where it counts the most—challenging abuses of power that betray the public trust," according to the U.S.-based Government Accountability Project. They have noted, however, that ambiguities remain in the Directive regarding application in some areas, such as "duty speech," that is, when employees report the same information in the course of a job assignment, for example, to a supervisor, instead of whistleblowing as formal dissent. In fact, duty speech is how the overwhelming majority of whistleblowing information gets communicated, and where the free flow of information is needed for proper functioning of organizations. However it is in response to such "duty speech" employee communication that the vast majority of retaliation against employees occurs. These observers have noted that the Directive must be understood as applying to protection against retaliation for such duty speech because without such an understanding the Directive will "miss the iceberg of what's needed".

France 
In France, several laws, all recent, have established a protection regime for whistleblowers. Prior to 2016, there were several laws in force which created disparate legislation with sector-specific regimes. The 2016 law on transparency, fight against corruption and modernization of economic life (known as the "Sapin 2 Law") provides for the first time a single legal definition of whistleblowers in France. It excludes certain professional secrets such as national defense secrecy, medical secrecy or the secrecy of relations between a lawyer and his client.

In 2022, two laws are passed to transpose the European Directive 2019/1937 of 23 October 2019 on the protection of persons who report breaches of Union law. One of them strengthens the role of the Défenseur des droits - the French ombudsman - tasked with advising and protecting whistleblowers. The second amends the Sapin 2 law to bring it into line with the directive and adds substantial guarantees not included in the directive among which:

 The definition of whistleblowing in force under the ‘Sapin 2’ law – which includes not work-based whistleblowing - has been maintained.
 The protection applies to any natural person who facilitate or assist whistleblowers – as required in the directive – but also to entities such as NGO or trade unions which act as a facilitator. They are offered the same level of protection.
 Military personnel will now be afforded the same level of protection as other civil servants, so long as they do not disclose information that may harm national security.
 The law provides that whistleblowers may be granted financial assistance, when subjected to a suit, by making an application to a judge, who has the power to force the organization which is suing – the employer for instance - to provide to cover legal fees and, where relevant, to cover their living expenses where their financial situation has deteriorated.
 The law provides that whistleblowers shall not incur criminal liability in respect of the acquisition of, or access to, the information which is reported or publicly disclosed. They cannot be sentenced for any offenses committed in order to gather proof or information as long as they obtained it in a lawful manner.
 The law strengthens existing sanctions against those who retaliate against whistleblowers: the criminal sanctions appliable to persons retaliating against whistleblowers can go up to three years of imprisonment and a fine of 45 000 €. The judges may impose 60 000 € fines on companies who taking a SLAPP action against a whistleblower.

The law allows any person to apply to the Défenseur des droits for an opinion on his or her status as a whistleblower. A response should be given within six months after receiving the application. The organic law provides that the Défenseur des droits will publish a report every two years on the overall functioning of whistleblower protection addressed to the French President of the Republic, the President of the National Assembly and the President of the Senate.

Jamaica
In Jamaica, the Protected Disclosures Act, 2011 received assent in March 2011. It creates a comprehensive system for the protection of whistleblowers in the public and private sector. It is based on the Public Interest Disclosure Act 1998.

India

The Government of India had been considering adopting a whistleblower protection law for several years. In 2003, the Law Commission of India recommended the adoption of the Public Interest Disclosure (Protection of Informers) Act, 2002. In August 2010, the Public Interest Disclosure and Protection of Persons Making the Disclosures Bill, 2010 was introduced into the Lok Sabha, lower house of the Parliament of India. The Bill was approved by the cabinet in June 2011. The Public Interest Disclosure and Protection of Persons Making the Disclosures Bill, 2010 was renamed as The Whistleblowers' Protection Bill, 2011 by the Standing Committee on Personnel, Public Grievances, Law and Justice. The Whistleblowers' Protection Bill, 2011 was passed by the Lok Sabha on 28 December 2011. and by the Rajyasabha on 21 February 2014. The Whistle Blowers Protection Act, 2011 has received the Presidential assent on 9 May 2014 and the same has been subsequently published in the official gazette of the Government of India on 9 May 2014 by the Ministry of Law and Justice, Government of India.

Ireland
The government of Ireland committed to adopting a comprehensive whistleblower protection law in January 2012. The Protected Disclosures Act (PDA) was passed in 2014. The law covers workers in the public and private sectors, and also includes contractors, trainees, agency staff, former employees and job seekers. A range of different types of misconduct may be reported under the law, which provides protections for workers from a range of employment actions as well as whistleblowers' identity.

Netherlands
The Netherlands has measures in place to mitigate the risks of whistleblowing: the House for Whistleblowers (Huis voor klokkenluiders) offers advice and support to whistleblowers, and the Parliament passed a proposal in 2016 to establish this house for whistleblowers, to protect them from the severe negative consequences that they might endure (Kamerstuk, 2013). Dutch media organizations also provide whistleblower support; on 9September 2013 a number of major Dutch media outlets supported the launch of Publeaks, which provides a secure website for people to leak documents to the media. Publeaks is designed to protect whistleblowers. It operates on the GlobaLeaks software developed by the Hermes Center for Transparency and Digital Human Rights, which supports whistleblower-oriented technologies internationally.

Switzerland
The Swiss Council of States agreed on a draft amendment of the Swiss Code of Obligations in September 2014. The draft introduces articles 321abis to 321asepties, 328(3), 336(2)(d). An amendment of article 362(1) adds articles 321abis to 321asepties to the list of provisions that may not be overruled by labour and bargaining agreements.
Article 321ater introduces an obligation on employees to report irregularities to their employer before reporting to an authority. An employee will, however, not breach his duty of good faith if he reports an irregularity to an authority and
 a period set by the employer and no longer than 60 days has lapsed since the employee has reported the incident to his employer, and
 the employer has not addressed the irregularity or it is obvious that the employer has insufficiently addressed the irregularity.
Article 321aquarter provides that an employee may exceptionally directly report to an authority. Exceptions apply in cases
 where the employee is in a position to objectively demonstrate that a report to his employer will prove ineffective,
 where the employee has to anticipate dismissal,
 where the employee must assume that the competent authority will be hindered in investigating the irregularity, or
 where there is a direct and serious hazard to life, to health, to safety, or to the environment.
The draft does not improve on protection against dismissal for employees who report irregularities to their employer. The amendment does not provide for employees anonymously filing their observations of irregularities.

United Kingdom

Whistleblowing in the United Kingdom is protected by the Public Interest Disclosure Act 1998 (PIDA). Amongst other things, under the Act protected disclosures are permitted even if a non-disclosure agreement has been signed between the employer and the former or current employee; a consultation on further restricting confidentiality clauses was held in 2019.

The Freedom to Speak Up Review set out 20 principles to bring about improvements to help whistleblowers in the NHS, including:
 Culture of raising concerns – to make raising issues a part of normal routine business of a well-led NHS organization.
 Culture free from bullying – freedom of staff to speak out relies on staff being able to work in a culture which is free from bullying.
 Training – every member of staff should receive training in their trust's approach to raising concerns and in receiving and acting on them.
 Support – all NHS trusts should ensure there is a dedicated person to whom concerns can be easily reported and without formality, a "speak up guardian" .
 Support to find alternative employment in the NHS – where a worker who has raised a concern cannot, as a result, continue their role, the NHS should help them seek an alternative job.

Monitor produced a whistleblowing policy in November 2015 that all NHS organizations in England are obliged to follow. It explicitly says that anyone bullying or acting against a whistleblower could be potentially liable to disciplinary action.

United States

Whistleblowing tradition in what would soon become the United States had a start in 1773 with Benjamin Franklin leaking a few letters in the Hutchinson affair. The release of the communications from royal governor Thomas Hutchinson to Thomas Whately led to a firing, a duel and arguably, both through the many general impacts of the leak and its role in convincing Franklin to join the radicals' cause, the taking of another important final step toward the American Revolution.

The first act of the Continental Congress in favor of what later came to be called whistleblowing came in the 1777-8 case of Samuel Shaw and Richard Marven. The two seamen accused Commander in Chief of the Continental Navy Esek Hopkins of torturing British prisoners of war. The Congress dismissed Hopkins and then agreed to cover the defense cost of the pair after Hopkins filed a libel suit against them under which they were imprisoned. Shaw and Marven were subsequently cleared in a jury trial.

To be considered a whistleblower in the United States, most federal whistleblower statutes require that federal employees have reason to believe their employer violated some law, rule, or regulation; testify or commence a legal proceeding on the legally protected matter; or refuse to violate the law.

In cases where whistleblowing on a specified topic is protected by statute, U.S. courts have generally held that such whistleblowers are protected from retaliation. However, a closely divided U.S. Supreme Court decision, Garcetti v. Ceballos (2006) held that the First Amendment free speech guarantees for government employees do not protect disclosures made within the scope of the employees' duties.

In the United States, legal protections vary according to the subject matter of the whistleblowing, and sometimes the state where the case arises. In passing the 2002 Sarbanes–Oxley Act, the Senate Judiciary Committee found that whistleblower protections were dependent on the "patchwork and vagaries" of varying state statutes. Still, a wide variety of federal and state laws protect employees who call attention to violations, help with enforcement proceedings, or refuse to obey unlawful directions. While this patchwork approach has often been criticized, it is also responsible for the United States having more dedicated whistleblowing laws than any other country.

The first US law adopted specifically to protect whistleblowers was the 1863 United States False Claims Act (revised in 1986), which tried to combat fraud by suppliers of the United States government during the American Civil War. The Act encourages whistleblowers by promising them a percentage of the money recovered by the government and by protecting them from employment retaliation.

Another US law that specifically protects whistleblowers is the Lloyd–La Follette Act of 1912. It guaranteed the right of federal employees to furnish information to the United States Congress. The first US environmental law to include an employee protection was the Clean Water Act of 1972. Similar protections were included in subsequent federal environmental laws, including the Safe Drinking Water Act (1974), Resource Conservation and Recovery Act (1976), Toxic Substances Control Act of 1976, Energy Reorganization Act of 1974 (through 1978 amendment to protect nuclear whistleblowers), Comprehensive Environmental Response, Compensation, and Liability Act (CERCLA, or the Superfund Law) (1980), and the Clean Air Act (1990). Similar employee protections enforced through OSHA are included in the Surface Transportation Assistance Act (1982) to protect truck drivers, the Pipeline Safety Improvement Act (PSIA) of 2002, the Wendell H. Ford Aviation Investment and Reform Act for the 21st Century ("AIR 21"), and the Sarbanes–Oxley Act, enacted on 30 July 2002 (for corporate fraud whistleblowers). More recent laws with some whistleblower protection include the Patient Protection and Affordable Care Act ("ACA", the Consumer Product Safety Improvement Act ("CPSIA"), the Seamans Protection Act as amended by the Coast Guard Authorization Act of 2010 ("SPA"), the Consumer Financial Protection Act ("CFPA"), the FDA Food Safety Modernization Act ("FSMA"), the Moving Ahead for Progress in the 21st Century Act ("MAP-21"), and the Taxpayer First Act ("TFA").

Investigation of retaliation against whistleblowers under 23 federal statutes falls under the jurisdiction of Directorate of Whistleblower Protection Program of the United States Department of Labor's Occupational Safety and Health Administration (OSHA). New whistleblower statutes enacted by Congress, which are to be enforced by the Secretary of Labor, are generally delegated by a Secretary's Order to OSHA's Directorate of Whistleblower Protection Program (DWPP).

The patchwork of laws means that victims of retaliation need to be aware of the laws at issue to determine the deadlines and means for making proper complaints. Some deadlines are as short as 10 days (Arizona State Employees have 10 days to file a "Prohibited Personnel Practice" Complaint before the Arizona State Personnel Board), while others are up to 300 days.

Those who report a false claim against the federal government, and suffer adverse employment actions as a result, may have up to six years (depending on state law) to file a civil suit for remedies under the US False Claims Act (FCA). Under a qui tam provision, the "original source" for the report may be entitled to a percentage of what the government recovers from the offenders. However, the "original source" must also be the first to file a federal civil complaint for recovery of the federal funds fraudulently obtained, and must avoid publicizing the claim of fraud until the US Justice Department decides whether to prosecute the claim itself. Such qui tam lawsuits must be filed under seal, using special procedures to keep the claim from becoming public until the federal government makes its decision on direct prosecution.

The Espionage Act of 1917 has been used to prosecute whistleblowers in the United States including Edward Snowden and Chelsea Manning. In 2013, Manning was convicted of violating the Espionage Act and sentenced to 35 years in prison for leaking sensitive military documents to WikiLeaks. The same year, Snowden was charged with violating the Espionage Act for releasing confidential documents belonging to the NSA.

Section 922 of the Dodd–Frank Wall Street Reform and Consumer Protection Act (Dodd-Frank) in the United States incentivizes and protects whistleblowers. By Dodd-Frank, the U.S. Securities and Exchange Commission (SEC) financially rewards whistleblowers for providing original information about violations of federal securities laws that results in sanctions of at least $1M. Additionally, Dodd-Frank offers job security to whistleblowers by illegalizing termination or discrimination due to whistleblowing. The whistleblower provision has proven successful; after the enactment of Dodd-Frank, the SEC charged KBR (company) and BlueLinx Holdings Inc. (company) with violating the whistleblower protection Rule 21F-17 by having employees sign confidentiality agreements that threatened repercussions for discussing internal matters with outside parties. Former President Donald Trump announced plans to dismantle Dodd-Frank in 2016. He created the Office of Accountability and Whistleblower Protection as a part of the Department of Veterans Affairs, which reportedly instead punished whistleblowers.

The US Department of Labor's Whistleblower Protection Program can handle many types of retaliation claims based on legal actions an employee took or was perceived to take in the course of their employment. Moreover, in the United States, if the retaliation occurred due to the perception of who the employee is as a person, the Equal Employment Opportunity Commission may be able to accept a complaint of retaliation. In an effort to overcome those fears, in 2010 Dodd–Frank Wall Street Reform and Consumer Protection Act was put forth to provide great incentive to whistleblowers. For example, if a whistleblower gave information which could be used to legally recover over one million dollars; then they could receive ten to thirty percent of it.

Whistleblowers have risen within the technology industry as it has expanded in recent years. Protection for these specific whistleblowers falls short; they often end up unemployed or worse- in jail. The Dodd-Frank Wall Street Reform and Consumer Protection Act offers an incentive for private sector whistleblowers, but only if they go to the SEC with information. If a whistleblower acts internally, as they often do in the technology industry, they are not protected by the law. Scandals, such as the Dragonfly search engine scandal and the Pompliano lawsuit against snapchat, have drawn attention to whistleblowers in technology.

The federally recognized National Whistleblower Appreciation Day is observed annually on 30 July, on the anniversary of the country's original 1778 whistleblower protection law.

Other countries
There are comprehensive laws in New Zealand and South Africa. A number of other countries have recently adopted comprehensive whistleblower laws including Ghana, South Korea, and Uganda. They are also being considered in Kenya and Rwanda. The European Court of Human Rights ruled in 2008 that whistleblowing was protected as freedom of expression. Nigeria has progressed into formulating the Whistleblowing Policy in 2016. However, this has not yet been established as law. The Whistle-blower Protection bill is still pending at the National Assembly. In February 2017, Nigeria also set up a whistleblowing policy against corruption and other ills in the country.

Advocacy for whistleblower rights and protections
Many NGOs advocate for stronger and more comprehensive legal rights and protections for whistleblowers. Among them are the Government Accountability Project (GAP), Blueprint for Free Speech, Public Concern at Work (PCaW), the Open Democracy Advice Centre or in France, the Maison des Lanceurs d'Alerte (MLA). An international network - the Whistleblowing International Network (WIN) - aimed at gathering these NGOs.

Frank Serpico, an NYPD whistleblower, prefers to use the term "lamp-lighter" to describe the whistleblower's role as a watchman. The Lamplighter Project, which aims to encourage law enforcement officers to report corruption and abuse of power and helps them do so, is named based on Serpico's usage of the term.

Modern methods used for whistleblower protection
Whistleblowers who may be at risk from those they are exposing are now using encryption methods and anonymous content sharing software to protect their identity. Tor, a highly accessible anonymity network, is one that is frequently used by whistleblowers around the world. Tor has undergone a number of large security updates to protect the identities of potential whistleblowers who may wish to anonymously leak information.

Recently specialized whistleblowing software like SecureDrop and GlobaLeaks has been built on top of the Tor technology to incentivize and simplify its adoption for secure whistleblowing.

Whistleblowing hotline
In business, whistleblowing hotlines are usually deployed as a way of mitigating risk, with the intention of providing secure, anonymous reporting for employees or third party suppliers who may otherwise be fearful of reprisals from their employer. As such, implementing a corporate whistleblowing hotline is often seen as a step towards compliance, and can also highlight an organization's stance on ethics. It is widely agreed that implementing a dedicated service for whistleblowers has a positive effect on an organizational culture.

A whistleblowing hotline is sometimes also referred to as an ethics hotline or 'Speak Up' hotline and is often facilitated by an outsourced service provider to encourage potential disclosers to come forward.

In 2018, the Harvard Business Review published findings to support the idea that whistleblowing hotlines are crucial to keeping companies healthy, stating "More whistles blown are a sign of health, not illness."

In popular culture
One of the subplots for season6 of the popular American TV show The Office focused on Andy Bernard, a salesman, discovering the printers of his company catch on fire, struggling with how to deal with the news, and the company's response to the whistleblower going public.

The 1998 film Star Trek: Insurrection involved Picard and the NCC-1701-E Enterprise crew risking their Starfleet careers to blow the whistle on a Federation conspiracy with the Son’a to forcibly relocate the Ba’ku from their planet.

In 2014, the rock/industrial band Laibach on its eighth studio album Spectre released a song titled "The Whistleblowers". It was released on 3 March 2014 under Mute Records.

In 2016, the rock band Thrice released a song titled "Whistleblower" off of the album To Be Everywhere Is to Be Nowhere. The song is written from the perspective of Snowden.

In July 2018, CBS debuted a new reality television show entitled Whistleblower, hosted by lawyer, former judge and police officer Alex Ferrer which covers qui tam suits under the False Claims Act against companies that have allegedly defrauded the federal government.

See also

Notes and references

Bibliography

 Arnold, Jason Ross (2019). Whistleblowers, Leakers, and Their Networks: From Snowden to Samizdat. Rowman & Littlefield.
Banisar, David "Whistleblowing: International Standards and Developments", in Corruption and Transparency: Debating the Frontiers between State, Market and Society, I. Sandoval, ed., World Bank-Institute for Social Research, UNAM, Washington, D.C., 2011 available online at ssrn.com
 (Open Access)
Ceva, Emanuela and Bocchiola, Michele (2018). Is Whistleblowing a duty?, Cambridge: Polity Press.
Dempster, Quentin Whistleblowers, Sydney, ABC Books, 1997.  [See especially pp. 199–212: 'The Courage of the Whistleblowers']
Frais, A "Whistleblowing heroes – boon or burden?", Bulletin of Medical Ethics, 2001 Aug:(170):13–19.
Garrett, Allison, "Auditor Whistle Blowing: The Financial Fraud Detection and Disclosure Act," 17 Seton Hall Legis. J. 91 (1993).

 Lauretano, Major Daniel A., "The Military Whistleblower Protection Act and the Military Mental Health Protection Act", Army Law, (Oct) 1998.
 Lechner, Jay P. & Paul M. Sisco, "Sarbanes-Oxley Criminal Whistleblower Provisions & the Workplace: More Than Just Securities Fraud" 80 Florida B. J. 85 (June 2006)

Martin, Brian. Justice Ignited: The Dynamics of Backfire, (Lanham, MD: Rowman & Littlefield, 2007).
 Martin, Brian with Wendy Varney. Nonviolence Speaks: Communicating against Repression, (Cresskill, NJ: Hampton Press, 2003).
 Martin, Brian. Technology for Nonviolent Struggle , (London: War Resisters' International, 2001).
 Martin, Brian with Lyn Carson. Random Selection in Politics, (Westport, CT: Praeger, 1999).
 Martin, Brian. The Whistleblower's Handbook: How to Be an Effective Resister, (Charlbury, UK: Jon Carpenter; Sydney: Envirobook, 1999). Updated and republished 2013 as Whistleblowing: a practical guide, Sparsnäs, Sweden: Irene Publishing.
 McCarthy, Robert J. "Blowing in the Wind: Answers for Federal Whistleblowers", 3 William & Mary Policy Review 184 (2012).

 Rowe, Mary & Bendersky, Corinne, "Workplace Justice, Zero Tolerance and Zero Barriers: Getting People to Come Forward in Conflict Management Systems," in Negotiations and Change, From the Workplace to Society, Thomas Kochan and Richard Locke (eds), Cornell University Press, 2002
 Wilkey, Robert N. Esq., "Federal Whistleblower Protection: A Means to Enforcing Maximum Hour Legislation for Medical Residents",  William Mitchell Law Review, Vol. 30, Issue 1 (2003).
Engineering Ethics concepts and cases by Charles E. Harris, Jr. – Michael S. Pritchard- Michael J. Rabins.
 IRS.gov , Whistleblower – Informant Award
 Whistleblower& Laws Australia – Global and Australian Laws: Steven Asnicar, 2019

External links

 
 Public Interest Disclosure Act 1998  from Her Majesty's Stationery Office
 National Security Whistleblowers, a Congressional Research Service (CRS) Report
 Survey of Federal Whistleblower and Anti-Retaliation Laws, a Congressional Research Service (CRS) Report
 Whistleblower Protection Program & information at U.S. Department of Labor
 Read v. Canada (Attorney General) Canadian legal framework regarding whistleblowing defence
 Patients First
 Whistleblowers UK 
 Why be a whistleblower?
 Author Eyal Press discusses whistleblowers and heroism on Conversations from Penn State
 "Digital Dissidents: What it Means to be a Whistleblower". Al Jazeera English.

 
Anti-corporate activism
Dissent
Freedom of expression
Freedom of speech
Grounds for termination of employment
Labour law
Political terminology
United States federal labor legislation
Workplace bullying
1970s neologisms